Pacific Coast University (PCU), currently exclusively consisting of the Pacific Coast University School of Law, is a private law school in Long Beach, California.

History

Founded in 1927, the PCU originally consisted of an undergraduate program along with graduate schools in business, divinity and law. However, all but the School of Law closed during the Great Depression. World War II nearly eliminated the School of Law but for the persistence of then Dean Carl Manson, who taught all the classes while the other professors were off at war. Manson continued as Dean until his death in 1980. In 1981 Dean Irving Schleimer, previously a member of the faculty, became the PCU's new dean.

Accreditation

The PCU School of Law was granted accreditation by the Committee of Bar Examiners of the State Bar of California on September 25, 2010. Due to its mission as an evening-only law school, PCU is not eligible to apply for accreditation by the American Bar Association.  As a result, while PCU graduates may sit for the California Bar Exam, and should they pass, join the California Bar, they are generally ineligible to practice law in other states.
On June 22, 2020, Pacific Coast University, School of Law was officially notified by the Committee of Bar Examiners (CBE) of the State of California that its accreditation and degree-granting authority has been terminated effective August 20, 2020 due to non-compliance with the minimum California Bar pass rate.

References

External links
 

Law schools in California
Educational institutions established in 1927
Universities and colleges in Los Angeles County, California
Long Beach, California
Private universities and colleges in California
1927 establishments in California